The Blockade of Callao was a military operation that occurred during the War of the Pacific or the Salitre War and that consisted of the Chilean squadron preventing the entry of ships to the port of Callao and the neighboring coves between 10 April 1880 and 17 January 1881.

Blockade
Commencing on 10 April 1880, the Chilean Navy fleet began a light blockade of the Peruvian port of Callao. The Chilean fleet would slowly grow as additional ships became available from other regions of the campaign. Likewise, the Peruvian Navy would arm local vessels as equipment allowed.

Several times over the year that the blockade was effected, the Chilean fleet would sortie and bombard the city. This was frequently in response to a Peruvian attack, such as the repeated successful deployment of disguised floating bombs.

Scuttling of the Peruvian fleet
After the successful attacks on the Lima suburbs of San Juan and Miraflores it became apparent that the city was going to fall to the advancing Chilean Army. During the night of 16 January 1881, after the defeat of the Peruvian Army in the battles of San Juan and Miraflores, the Secretary of the Navy, Captain Manuel Villar, ordered the destruction of port defences and the remaining ships of the Peruvian Navy to prevent their capture by Chilean troops. This order was executed by the captains Germán Astete and Manuel Villavisencio during the dawn of 17 January 1881. Among the ships scuttled were the last Peruvian ironclad, the monitor , the corvette Unión, the training ship , as well as Peru's first submarine, .

Ships scuttled
The Peruvian ships scuttled by its crew before they could being captured, included:

Surrender
Callao surrendered on 18 January 1881, the day after the fleet was scuttled.

References

   navsource.org: USS Catawba 
   hazegray.org: USS Catawba 
 Yábar Acuña, Francisco (2001). Las Fuerzas Sútiles y la defensa de costa en la Guerra del Pacífico, Fondo de Publicaciones Dirección de Intereses Marítimos.

External links
   War of the Pacific

Battles involving Chile
Battles involving Peru
Battles of the War of the Pacific
1881 in Peru
Maritime incidents in 1881
Scuttled vessels of Peru